Path of Destruction may refer to:
 Path of Destruction (film), a 2005 made-for-TV film
 "Path of Destruction" (Thunderbirds episode)
 Star Wars: Darth Bane: Path of Destruction, a novel